About Baghdad is a documentary film shot in Baghdad, Iraq in 2003.  It is the first documentary film to have been made in Iraq following the fall of the Baath regime.  The film features the artist Sinan Antoon as he returns to his native Baghdad.  It privileges the voices of native Iraqis from all walks of life, as they present their views on life during the regime of Saddam Hussein as well as the United States's bombing, invasion, and occupation.

The film was directed by a collective including Sinan Antoon, Bassam Haddad, Maya Mikdashi, Suzy Salamy, and Adam Shapiro.  It was produced by InCounter Productions.

External links
Official site

American documentary films
American independent films
Documentary films about the Iraq War
2004 films
Baghdad
Documentary films about cities
2004 documentary films
2000s American films